Arbas del Puerto or Arbás del Puerto is a hamlet located in the municipality of Villamanín, in León province, Castile and León, Spain. As of 2020, it has a population of 4.

Geography 
Arbas del Puerto is located 59km north-northwest of León, Spain.

References

Populated places in the Province of León